In the theory of finite population sampling, Bernoulli sampling is a sampling process where each element of the population is subjected to an independent Bernoulli trial which determines whether the element becomes part of the sample. An essential property of Bernoulli sampling is that all elements of the population have equal probability of being included in the sample.

Bernoulli sampling is therefore a special case of Poisson sampling.  In Poisson sampling each element of the population may have a different probability of being included in the sample. In Bernoulli sampling, the probability is equal for all the elements.

Because each element of the population is considered separately for the sample, the sample size is not fixed but rather follows a binomial distribution.

Example

The most basic Bernoulli method generates n random variates to extract a sample from a population of n items.  Suppose you want to extract a given percentage pct of the population.  The algorithm can be described as follows:

 for each item in the set
     generate a random non-negative integer R
     if (R mod 100) < pct then
         select item

  A percentage of 20%, say, is usually expressed as a probability p=0.2.  In that case, random variates are generated in the unit interval.  After running the algorithm, a sample of size k will have been selected.  One would expect to have , which is more and more likely as n grows.  In fact, It is possible to calculate the probability of obtaining a sample size of k by the Binomial distribution:

The values are shown in logarithmic scale.

On the right the minimum values of  that satisfy given error bounds with 95% probability.  Given an error, the set of 's within bounds can be described as follows:

The probability to end up within  is given again by the binomial distribution as:

The picture shows the lowest values of  such that the sum is at least 0.95.  For  and  the algorithm delivers exact results for all 's.  The 's in between are obtained by bisection.  Note that, if  is an integer percentage, guarantees that .  Values as high as  can be required for such an exact match.

See also
Poisson sampling
Bernoulli trial
Bernoulli process
Sampling design

References

External links
 Faster Random Samples With Gap Sampling

Sampling techniques